Hutzpit the Interpreter (Ḥūṣpīṯ hamMəṯūrgəmān) was a rabbi from the third generation of tannaim.

Biography
His title comes from his position as the interpreter of Rabban Gamaliel II: Gamaliel would speak softly, and Hutzpit would announce Gamaliel's words to the listeners. At one point he lived in Tzippori and had contact with rabbis Eleazar ben Azariah, Jeshbab the Scribe, Halafta, and Johanan ben Nuri.

He is described as one of the Ten Martyrs in the Midrash Eleh Ezkerah, where he is said to have been murdered and dismembered "one day short of his 130th birthday". According to one story, Elisha ben Abuyah lost his faith after seeing Hutzpit's detached tongue lying in the dust after the murder.

References

 It has the following bibliography:
Zunz, G. V. p. 142;
A. Jellinek, B. H. 2:23 et seq.; 5:41; 6:17 et seq.;
Benjacob, Oẓar ha-Sefarim, p. 299.
On the problem of the synchronism of the ten martyrs see Heinrich Grätz, Gesch. iv. 175 et seq., and Monatsschrift, i. 314 et seq.
A German translation by P. Möbius appeared in 1845.

2nd-century deaths
Jewish martyrs
Mishnah rabbis
People executed by the Roman Empire
Smaller midrashim